"Hype Pressure" is an episode of the award-winning British comedy television series The Goodies.

This episode is also known as "The Rock and Roll Revival".

Written by The Goodies, with songs and music by Bill Oddie.

Plot
Tim is the presenter and producer of "New Faeces", a TV talent show. Having run out of awful acts to humiliate, he overhears Bill and Graeme in the Goodies' office trying to write a new single and ending up trying to perform like folk singers. He invites the pair onto the show, but their dreadful performance actually goes down well with the audience and the judges (including the hard to please Tony Bitch), leaving a furious Tim out of a job.

However, Tim then hits on the idea of the 1950s/rock and roll revival.  When Bill points out that that's already been done, he brings back the rock and roll revival and the country is plunged into a ridiculous obsession with everything 1950s, to the point that even the TV has turned into a 1950s version of it. Worse yet, Tim has turned into a sock-selling conman and a TV director, and the boys have been called for two years in the army as National Service has been reinstated.

The next day, Tim fools Graeme and Bill into thinking that his revivalist stuff has gone stale and invites them to appear on another of his hideous shows, Superficial with Tim as a flamboyant, white-haired director who begins cue-ing every sort of thing while Bill and Graeme perform as a hippie duo, including the return of World War II.

After Tim, Graeme and Bill "cues" in various foes, Kitten Kong and the Giant Dougal make brief cameo appearances, as do the special effects team working the strings, Bill and Graeme cue a "Party Political Broadcast" starring Margaret Thatcher, which beats Tim into submission.

Cultural references
1950s nostalgia was an important trend in 1970s-era UK, featured in films like American Graffiti and That'll Be The Day and the TV series Happy Days. This would go on until the 1980s with Grease, Animal House and the TV programme Hi-De-Hi among others.

 Tony Hatch
 Supersonic
 World War II
 New Faces
 Stars On Sunday
 Six-Five Special
 Oh Boy
 Little Richard
 Simon and Garfunkel

Notes
 During the opening sequence, there is another swipe at Tony Blackburn, a long-running Goodies target of ridicule, in the shape of Graeme's book Play Guitar My Way and Other Jokes by Tony Blackburn.
 During the 1950s revival scenes, Bill's complaint that "they've taken off Porridge and Fawlty Towers" (both popular BBC sitcoms of the day, and still being regularly repeated) gets a spontaneous boo from the studio audience. Similarly, the mention of Muffin the Mule, a well-loved marionette from the early days of the BBC, gets a spontaneous nostalgic cheer of recognition.
 Tim's reinvention as a 'black marketeer' is an obvious parody of the George Cole character "Flash Harry" from the long-running St Trinian's series of British comedy films.
 The cowboy footage during the end sequence is gleaned from They Died with Their Boots On.
 After a wait of 33 years, this episode premiered on the Australian Broadcasting Corporation's ABC2 on 13 December 2010, although on a post-watershed time period.

References

 "The Complete Goodies" — Robert Ross, B T Batsford, London, 2000
 "The Goodies Rule OK" — Robert Ross, Carlton Books Ltd, Sydney, 2006
 "From Fringe to Flying Circus — 'Celebrating a Unique Generation of Comedy 1960-1980'" — Roger Wilmut, Eyre Methuen Ltd, 1980
 "The Goodies Episode Summaries" — Brett Allender
 "The Goodies — Fact File" — Matthew K. Sharp

External links
 

The Goodies (series 6) episodes
1976 British television episodes